Bunbury Terminal (also known as Bunbury Passenger Terminal) is a train and bus station for Transwa services. The terminal is located in East Bunbury, Western Australia.

It is the terminus station for the Australind train service to/from Perth along the South Western line. It was built as a replacement for the more centrally located station, being opened on 29 May 1985 by Minister for Transport Julian Grill.

Transwa coach services operate to Walpole, Augusta, Pemberton, Donnybrook, Collie, Boyup Brook and Bridgetown.

TransBunbury bus routes 826 and 827 connect Bunbury Terminal with the Bunbury city centre.

Platform

Bus routes
Transwa coach services

TransBunbury services

References

Bunbury, Western Australia
Railway stations in Western Australia
Railway stations in Australia opened in 1985
Buildings and structures in Bunbury, Western Australia